Boy Culture is a 1995 novel by Matthew Rettenmund. It centers on a call boy in the city of Chicago, Illinois and his two roommates. The protagonist goes by X throughout the book in order to maintain his anonymity. In 2006, it was adapted into a movie by filmmaker Q. Allan Brocka, starring Patrick Bauchau, Darryl Stephens, Emily Stiles, and newcomer Derek Magyar as "X". Award Nominated writers Craig Hepworth and Adele Stanhope are adapting the novel to the stage, Boy Culture the play will open August 2012 in Manchester, UK and will be produced by Vertigo Theatre Productions.

Characters

Main characters
 X is a male prostitute, and has been ever since he was young
 Andrew is X's love interest and one of his two roommates
 Joe, X's other roommate is a "seventeen-and-a-half" year old twink, who has a crush on X

1995 American novels
1990s LGBT novels
American LGBT novels
Novels set in Chicago
American novels adapted into films
Novels about American prostitution